Somasca is a hamlet in the northern Italian region of Lombardy, situated in the hills overlooking the south-eastern branch of Lake Como. For purposes of local government it counts as a frazione of the Commune of Vercurago, which falls within the Province of Lecco.

History
Somasca is known chiefly for having given its name to the Somaschi Fathers, an order of priests devoted to charitable works which was founded by Saint Gerolamo Emiliani in 1532.

Frazioni of the Province of Lecco
Cities and towns in Lombardy